Nicholas John Overhead (born 1942), is a male former athlete who competed for England.

Athletics career
He represented England in the 440 yards at the 1962 British Empire and Commonwealth Games in Perth, Western Australia.

He was a member of the Watford Harriers Club.

References

1942 births
English male sprinters
Athletes (track and field) at the 1962 British Empire and Commonwealth Games
Living people
Commonwealth Games competitors for England